Hygor is a given name. It may refer to:

 Hygor (footballer, born 1989), Hygor Guimarães Gonçalves, Brazilian football midfielder
 Hygor (footballer, born 1992), Hygor Cléber Garcia Silva, Brazilian football forward

See also
 Igor (given name)